The Downing Street Press Briefing Room is a news media room located in 9 Downing Street where press conferences are hosted by the Prime Minister, Cabinet ministers, and government officials. The Prime Minister also uses the room to give ministerial broadcasts to the country and the press.

History
The first broadcast made by a prime minister was by Anthony Eden on 27 April 1956 through the BBC, and over time press conferences have been held by prime ministers in different locations. Sometimes they have been held outside, in front of the door of No. 10 and then alternatively in the rose garden such as during the Cameron-Clegg coalition.

In more recent times, the state dining room in No. 10 has been used as a temporary press briefing room which has allowed for better coverage when there have been times of bad weather.

During the COVID-19 pandemic the government along with chief medical and science officers started to hold daily press briefings to keep members of the public updated, and to give the media an opportunity to ask questions. As a result of the growing number of press conferences needed on a daily basis, the government under Boris Johnson converted a room in No. 9 Downing Street into a permanent media conference room. This would allow members of media to have a permanent place in Downing Street, and would avoid having to convert the state dining room at No.10 into a temporary media room.

The first press conference held in the new briefing room was held by Boris Johnson on 29 March 2021. The first conference was hoped to have been held in the autumn of 2020, however delays to the construction meant conferences from the room would be held back.

Refitting
The new media refit cost up to £2.6 million when figures were released. A breakdown of the costs was released by the Cabinet Office under freedom of information, which showed the main workings of the room cost £1.8 million, broadband equipment £30,000 and long lead items up to £200,000.

References